John Oldrid Scott (17 July 1841 – 30 May 1913) was a British architect.

Biography
He was the son of Sir Gilbert Scott (George Gilbert Scott) and his wife Caroline (née Oldrid). His brother George Gilbert Scott Junior and nephew Sir Giles Gilbert Scott were also prominent architects. In 1868 he married Mary Ann Stevens, eldest daughter of the Reverend Thomas Stevens, founder of Bradfield College. One of his nine children, Charles Marriott Oldrid Scott, worked in his architectural practice.

At the end of his career he lived in Peasmarsh, near Rye, East Sussex, and the sale of his farmhouse and 136 acres was mentioned in the national press in 1928.

Works
St Stephen's Greek Orthodox Chapel, West Norwood Cemetery: started circa 1873
St. Peter's Church, Clayworth, Nottinghamshire: restoration 1874–75
St Michael and All Angels' Church, Stourport-on-Severn, Worcestershire: continuation of church designed by his father Sir G. G. Scott but unfinished at his death in 1881. Partly demolished and replaced by a new church.
St Thomas' Church, Osbaldwick: restoration 1877–1878

St Mary's Church, Slough: construction completed 1878, subsequently extended 1911–13 

 St Sophia's Greek Orthodox Cathedral, Bayswater, London: 1878–79
 St Mary's Church, Hayes, Kent: south aisle and transept, 1878–79
St Thomas of Canterbury's Church, Chester: completion of nave, 1881
 University College Boathouse, Oxford: 1880–81 (destroyed by fire 1999)
 St Laurence's Church, Frodsham, Cheshire: organ case, 1882
 St Bartholomew's Church, Hints, Staffordshire: 1882–83
 St John the Baptist's Church, Halesowen, West Midlands: outer south aisle, 1883
 St Mary the Virgin's Church, Adderbury, Oxfordshire: restoration, 1886
 Cathedral Church of the Resurrection, Lahore: 1887
 Church of St Giles, Stoke Poges, Buckinghamshire: lychgate, 1887
St John the Baptist's Church, Alkborough, Lincolnshire: chancel rebuilt, 1887
 St John the Baptist's Church, Croydon: Organ case, other interior designs 1888
 Mary the Virgin's Church, Thame, Oxfordshire: restoration, 1889–97
 St Mary and St Peter’s Church, Harlaxton, Lincolnshire: restoration, 1890–91
 St Denys' Church, Northmoor, Oxfordshire: rectory, 1891
 St John the Baptist's Church, Kinlet, Shropshire: restoration, 1892, and design of monument to Major CB Childe (killed 1900)

 St John the Evangelist's Church, Boscombe, Dorset: 1893–95 (with CT Miles)
 St George the Martyr's Church, New Wolverton, Buckinghamshire: transepts, 1894
 St Philip's Church, Hove: 1894–95
 St Alkmund's Church, Duffield, Derbyshire: restoration, 1896–97
 The Bute Hall, University of Glasgow: late 19th-century
 St. Mark's Church, Harrogate, West Riding: 1898
 St Nicholas' Church, Piddington, Oxfordshire: restoration, 1898
 St Michael's Church, Bournemouth, Dorset: tower, 1900–01
 St Mary the Virgin's Church, Denby, Derbyshire: restoration, 1901–03
St Giles' Church, Wendlebury, Oxfordshire: restoration, 1902
 Hereford Cathedral: west front, 1902–08

 St John the Evangelist's Church, Palmers Green, Middlesex: 1903–08
 St Mary and St Nicholas' Church, Compton, Berkshire: north aisle, 1905
 St Albans Cathedral, Hertfordshire: organ case, 1905
 St George the Martyr's Sunday School & Church Institute Building, New Wolverton, Buckinghamshire: 1907–08
 St Mary's Church, Princes Risborough, Buckinghamshire: rebuilding of west tower and spire, 1907–08
 St Michael and St George's Cathedral, Grahamstown, South Africa: chancel and nave, dedicated 1912

References

Sources and further reading

1841 births
1913 deaths
19th-century English architects
John Oldrid
20th-century English architects
Architects from London
People from Peasmarsh